Intervirology is a bimonthly peer-reviewed medical journal covering all aspects of virology, especially concerning animal viruses. It was established in 1973 and is published by Karger Publishers. The editor-in-chief is Jean-Claude Manuguerra.

History 
The journal was established in 1973 by J.L. Melnick as the Journal of the Virology Division of the International Union of Microbiological Societies. In 1982, it published a paper providing the first taxonomic description of the Ebola virus into the Filoviridae.

Abstracting and indexing 
Intervirology is abstracted and indexed in

According to the Journal Citation Reports, the journal has a 2013 impact factor of 1.773.

References

External links 
 

Karger academic journals
Publications established in 1973
English-language journals
Bimonthly journals
Virology journals